No Place on Earth is a 2012 documentary film produced, written and directed by Janet Tobias, based on Esther Stermer's memoir We Fight to Survive. It was released theatrically in the United States on April 5, 2013.

Synopsis
In 1993, NYPD officer and caving enthusiast Chris Nicola visited Ukraine to explore the Verteba and Priest's Grotto caves, and found evidence that they had recently been inhabited by humans. After discovering that the caves were used by three Jewish families (Stermer, Dodyk, and Wexler), comprising 38 people, led by matriarch Esther Stermer (1888–1983), escaping The Holocaust, he embarked on a decade-long quest to find survivors. The film features interviews with some of the 36 survivors and/or their descendants, now living mainly in New York City and Montreal. It includes a segment in which Tobias brings some of the survivors, the oldest of whom was a nonagenarian, back to the caves.

Release
The film was shown at the Toronto International Film Festival, the Hamptons International Film Festival, the International Documentary Film Festival Amsterdam, and the Jewish Film Festival Berlin.

Accolades
Its screenwriters, Janet Tobias and Paul Laikin, were nominated for Best Documentary Screenplay from the Writers Guild of America.

Cast
 Chris Nicola as himself
 Saul Stermer as himself
 Sam Stermer as himself
 Sonia Dodyk as herself
 Sima Dodyk as herself
 Yetta Stermer as herself
 Sol Wexler as himself
 Erin Grunstein Halpern as herself
 Cliff Stermer as himself
 Katalin Lábán as Esther Stermer
 Péter Balázs Kiss as Saul Stermer
 Dániel Hegedüs as Sol Wexler
 Balázs Barna Hídvégi as Nissel Stermer
 Fruzsina Pelikán as Sonia Dodyk
 András Orosz as Sam Stermer
 Mira Bonelli as Sima Dodyk
 Nóra Kovács as Yetta Stermer
 Bernadett Sára Borlai as Hannah Stermer
 Péter Zsömbelyi as Zaide Stermer
 Norbert Gogan as Louie Wexler

References

External links
 
 
 
 Review from Variety (September 9, 2012)
 Review at Roger's Movie Nation (February 24, 2013)

2012 films
Documentary films about the Holocaust
Films about Jews and Judaism
Films shot in Hungary
Films shot in Ukraine
The Holocaust in Ukraine
2010s English-language films